Darmstadtium (110Ds) is a synthetic element, and thus a standard atomic weight cannot be given. Like all synthetic elements, it has no stable isotopes. The first isotope to be synthesized was 269Ds in 1994. There are 10 known radioisotopes from 267Ds to 281Ds (with many gaps) and 2 or 3 known isomers. The longest-lived isotope is 281Ds with a half-life of 14 seconds.

List of isotopes 

|-
| 267Ds
| style="text-align:right" | 110
| style="text-align:right" | 157
| 267.14377(15)#
| 10(8) µs
| α ?
| 263Hs ?
| 3/2+#
|-
| 269Ds
| style="text-align:right" | 110
| style="text-align:right" | 159
| 269.14475(3)
| 230(110) µs[179(+245−66) µs]
| α
| 265Hs
| 3/2+#
|-
| 270Ds
| style="text-align:right" | 110
| style="text-align:right" | 160
| 270.14458(5)
| 160(100) µs[0.10(+14−4) ms]
| α
| 266Hs
| 0+
|-
| style="text-indent:1em" | 270mDs
| colspan="3" style="text-indent:2em" | 1140(70) keV
| 10(6) ms[6.0(+82−22) ms]
| α
| 266Hs
| (10)(−#)
|-
| 271Ds
| style="text-align:right" | 110
| style="text-align:right" | 161
| 271.14595(10)#
| 210(170) ms
| α
| 267Hs
| 11/2−#
|-
| style="text-indent:1em" | 271mDs
| colspan="3" style="text-indent:2em" | 29(29) keV
| 1.3(5) ms
| α
| 267Hs
| 9/2+#
|-
| 273Ds
| style="text-align:right" | 110
| style="text-align:right" | 163
| 273.14856(14)#
| 240(100) µs
| α
| 269Hs
| 13/2−#

|-
| rowspan=2|276Ds
| rowspan=2 style="text-align:right" | 110
| rowspan=2 style="text-align:right" | 166
| rowspan=2|276.15303(59)#
| rowspan=2|~66 µs
| SF (67%)
| (various)
| rowspan=2|0+
|-
| α (33%)
| 272Hs

|-
| 277Ds
| style="text-align:right" | 110
| style="text-align:right" | 167
| 277.15591(41)#
| 
| α
| 273Hs
| 11/2+#
|-
| rowspan=2|279Ds
| rowspan=2 style="text-align:right" | 110
| rowspan=2 style="text-align:right" | 169
| rowspan=2|279.16010(64)#
| rowspan=2|
| SF (87%)
| (various)
| rowspan=2|
|-
| α (13%)
| 275Hs
|-
| 280Ds
| style="text-align:right" | 110
| style="text-align:right" | 170
| 280.16131(89)#
| 
| SF
| (various)
| 0+
|-
| rowspan=2|281Ds
| rowspan=2 style="text-align:right" | 110
| rowspan=2 style="text-align:right" | 171
| rowspan=2|281.16451(59)#
| rowspan=2|14(3) s
| SF (90%)
| (various)
| rowspan=2|3/2+#
|-
| α (10%)
| 277Hs

Isotopes and nuclear properties

Nucleosynthesis
Superheavy elements such as darmstadtium are produced by bombarding lighter elements in particle accelerators that induce fusion reactions. Whereas most of the isotopes of darmstadtium can be synthesized directly this way, some heavier ones have only been observed as decay products of elements with higher atomic numbers.

Depending on the energies involved, the former are separated into "hot" and "cold". In hot fusion reactions, very light, high-energy projectiles are accelerated toward very heavy targets (actinides), giving rise to compound nuclei at high excitation energy (~40–50 MeV) that may either fission or evaporate several (3 to 5) neutrons. In cold fusion reactions, the produced fused nuclei have a relatively low excitation energy (~10–20 MeV), which decreases the probability that these products will undergo fission reactions. As the fused nuclei cool to the ground state, they require emission of only one or two neutrons, and thus, allows for the generation of more neutron-rich products. The latter is a distinct concept from that of where nuclear fusion claimed to be achieved at room temperature conditions (see cold fusion).

The table below contains various combinations of targets and projectiles which could be used to form compound nuclei with Z = 110.

Cold fusion
Before the first successful synthesis of darmstadtium in 1994 by the GSI team, scientists at GSI also tried to synthesize darmstadtium by bombarding lead-208 with nickel-64 in 1985. No darmstadtium atoms were identified. After an upgrade of their facilities, the team at GSI successfully detected 9 atoms of 271Ds in two runs of their discovery experiment in 1994. This reaction was successfully repeated in 2000 by GSI (4 atoms), in 2000 and 2004 by the Lawrence Berkeley National Laboratory (LBNL) (9 atoms in total) and in 2002 by RIKEN (14 atoms). The GSI team studied the analogous reaction with nickel-62 instead of nickel-64 in 1994 as part of their discovery experiment. Three atoms of 269Ds were detected. A fourth decay chain was measured but was subsequently retracted.

In addition to the official discovery reactions, in October–November 2000, the team at GSI also studied the analogous reaction using a lead-207 target in order to synthesize the new isotope 270Ds. They succeeded in synthesising eight atoms of 270Ds, relating to a ground state isomer, 270Ds, and a high-spin metastable state, 270mDs.

In 1986, a team at the Joint Institute for Nuclear Research (JINR) in Dubna, Russia, studied the reaction:

Bi + Co → Ds + n

They were unable to detect any darmstadtium atoms. In 1995, the team at LBNL reported that they had succeeded in detecting a single atom of 267Ds using this reaction. However, several decays were not measured and further research is required to confirm this discovery.

Hot fusion
In the late 1980s, the GSI team attempted to synthesize element 110 by bombarding a target consisting of various uranium isotopes—233U, 235U, and 238U—with accelerated argon-40 ions. No atoms were detected; a limiting cross section of 21 pb was reported.

In September 1994, the team at Dubna detected a single atom of 273Ds by bombarding a plutonium-244 target with accelerated sulfur-34 ions.

Experiments were done in 2004 at the Flerov Laboratory of Nuclear Reactions (FLNR) in Dubna studying the fission characteristics of the compound nucleus 280Ds, produced in the reaction:

Th + Ca → Ds* → fission

The result revealed how compound nuclei such as this fission predominantly by expelling magic and doubly magic nuclei such as 132Sn (Z = 50, N = 82). No darmstadtium atoms were obtained. A compound nucleus is a loose combination of nucleons that have not arranged themselves into nuclear shells yet. It has no internal structure and is held together only by the collision forces between the target and projectile nuclei. It is estimated that it requires around 10−14 s for the nucleons to arrange themselves into nuclear shells, at which point the compound nucleus becomes a nuclide, and this number is used by IUPAC as the minimum half-life a claimed isotope must have in order to be recognized as being discovered.

The 232Th+48Ca reaction was attempted again at the FLNR in 2022; it was predicted that the 48Ca-induced reaction leading to element 110 would have a lower yield than those leading to lighter or heavier elements. Detailed decay and cross-section data are not yet available. The JINR team intends to repeat this reaction in 2023 at a higher beam energy to corroborate these findings and search for the still-unknown 274Ds and 275Ds.

As decay product

Darmstadtium has been observed as a decay product of copernicium. Copernicium currently has seven known isotopes, four of which have been shown to alpha decay into darmstadtium, with mass numbers 273, 277, and 279–281. To date, all of these bar 273Ds have only been produced by decay of copernicium. Parent copernicium nuclei can be themselves decay products of flerovium or livermorium. Darmstadtium may also have been produced in the electron capture decay of roentgenium nuclei which are themselves daughters of nihonium and moscovium. For example, in 2004, the Dubna team (JINR) identified darmstadtium-281 as a product in the decay of livermorium via an alpha decay sequence:

 →  + 
 →  + 
 →  +

Retracted isotopes
280Ds
The first synthesis of element 114 resulted in two atoms assigned to 288Fl, decaying to the 280Ds, which underwent spontaneous fission. The assignment was later changed to 289Fl and the darmstadtium isotope to 281Ds. Hence, 280Ds remained unknown until 2016, when it was populated by the hitherto unknown alpha decay of 284Cn (previously, that nucleus was only known to undergo spontaneous fission). The discovery of 280Ds in this decay chain was confirmed in 2021; it undergoes spontaneous fission with a half-life of 360 µs.

277Ds
In the claimed synthesis of 293Og in 1999, the isotope 277Ds was identified as decaying by 10.18 MeV alpha emission with a half-life of 3.0 ms. This claim was retracted in 2001. This isotope was finally created in 2010 and its decay data supported the fabrication of previous data.

273mDs
In the synthesis of 277Cn in 1996 by GSI (see copernicium), one decay chain proceeded via 273Ds, which decayed by emission of a 9.73 MeV alpha particle with a lifetime of 170 ms. This would have been assigned to an isomeric level. This data could not be confirmed and thus this isotope is currently unknown or unconfirmed.

272Ds
In the first attempt to synthesize darmstadtium, a 10 ms SF activity was assigned to 272Ds in the reaction 232Th(44Ca,4n).  Given current understanding regarding stability, this isotope has been retracted from the table of isotopes.

Nuclear isomerism

281Ds
The production of 281Ds by the decay of 289Fl or 293Lv has produced two very different decay modes. The most common and readily confirmed mode is spontaneous fission with a half-life of 11 s. A much rarer and as yet unconfirmed mode is alpha decay by emission of an alpha particle with energy 8.77 MeV with an observed half-life of around 3.7 min. This decay is associated with a unique decay pathway from the parent nuclides and must be assigned to an isomeric level. The half-life suggests that it must be assigned to an isomeric state but further research is required to confirm these reports. It was suggested in 2016 that this unknown activity might be due to 282Mt, the great-granddaughter of 290Fl via electron capture and two consecutive alpha decays.

271Ds
Decay data from the direct synthesis of 271Ds clearly indicates the presence of two nuclear isomers. The first emits alpha particles with energies 10.74 and 10.69 MeV and has a half-life of 1.63 ms. The other only emits alpha particles with an energy of 10.71 MeV and has a half-life of 69 ms. The first has been assigned to the ground state and the latter to an isomeric level. It has been suggested that the closeness of the alpha decay energies indicates that the isomeric level may decay primarily by delayed isomeric transition to the ground state, resulting in an identical measured alpha energy and a combined half-life for the two processes.

270Ds
The direct production of 270Ds has clearly identified two nuclear isomers. The ground state decays by alpha emission into the ground state of 266Hs by emitting an alpha particle with energy 11.03 MeV and has a half-life of 0.10 ms. The metastable state decays by alpha emission, emitting alpha particles with energies of 12.15, 11.15, and 10.95 MeV, and has a half-life of 6 ms. When the metastable state emits an alpha particle of energy 12.15 MeV, it decays into the ground state of 266Hs, indicating that it has 1.12 MeV of excess energy.

Chemical yields of isotopes

Cold fusion
The table below provides cross-sections and excitation energies for cold fusion reactions producing darmstadtium isotopes directly. Data in bold represent maxima derived from excitation function measurements. + represents an observed exit channel.

Fission of compound nuclei with Z = 110
Experiments have been performed in 2004 at the Flerov Laboratory of Nuclear Reactions in Dubna studying the fission characteristics of the compound nucleus 280Ds. The nuclear reaction used is 232Th+48Ca. The result revealed how nuclei such as this fission predominantly by expelling closed shell nuclei such as 132Sn (Z = 50, N = 82).

Theoretical calculations

Decay characteristics
Theoretical calculation in a quantum tunneling model reproduces the experimental alpha decay half live data. It also predicts that the isotope 294Ds would have alpha decay half-life of the order of 311 years.

Evaporation residue cross sections
The below table contains various targets-projectile combinations for which calculations have provided estimates for cross section yields from various neutron evaporation channels. The channel with the highest expected yield is given.

DNS = Di-nuclear system; σ = cross section

References 

 Isotope masses from:

 Isotopic compositions and standard atomic masses from:

 Half-life, spin, and isomer data selected from the following sources.

 
Darmstadtium
Darmstadtium